William Henry Jordan (March 5, 1894 – April 19, 1948) was an American Negro league catcher in the 1920s.

A native of Harrisburg, Pennsylvania, Jordan made his Negro leagues debut in 1922 for the Harrisburg Giants. He played four seasons for the club through 1925, while also playing briefly for the Baltimore Black Sox in 1923. Jordan died in Harrisburg in 1948 at age 54.

References

External links
 and Baseball-Reference Black Baseball stats and Seamheads

1894 births
1948 deaths
Harrisburg Giants players
Baltimore Black Sox players
Baseball catchers
Baseball players from Harrisburg, Pennsylvania
20th-century African-American sportspeople